The 2021–22 Louisiana–Monroe Warhawks women's basketball team represented the University of Louisiana at Monroe during the 2021–22 NCAA Division I women's basketball season. The basketball team, led by second-year head coach Brooks Donald-Williams, played all home games at the Fant–Ewing Coliseum along with the Louisiana–Monroe Warhawks men's basketball team. They were members of the Sun Belt Conference.

Roster

Schedule and results

|-
!colspan=9 style=| Exhibition
|-

|-
!colspan=9 style=| Non-conference Regular Season
|-

|-
!colspan=9 style=| Conference Regular Season
|-

|-
!colspan=9 style=| Sun Belt Tournament

See also
 2021–22 Louisiana–Monroe Warhawks men's basketball team

References

Louisiana–Monroe Warhawks women's basketball seasons
Louisiana–Monroe Warhawks
Louisiana–Monroe Warhawks women's basketball
Louisiana–Monroe women's basketball